Major League Lacrosse All-Star Game is the all-star game of the MLL.

Years

2000s

2001
The inaugural 2001 All-Star Game, was titled the Major League Lacrosse LacrosseStar Game. From 2001–2003, the All-Star Game had the National Division playing the American Division. It did not schedule an All-Star Game in 2004.

2005
The 2005 game took place in Denver, Colorado on Saturday, July 2, 2005. The format for the 2005 game was "Old School" vs. "Young Guns". The rosters were determined by both fan and MLL team voting. Team "Old School" was composed of players who began their MLL careers in the league’s inaugural 2001 season. Members of the "Young Guns" team began their playing careers in 2002 through the present.

2006

The 2006 Major League Lacrosse All-Star game took place on July 6, 2006 at Boston University’s Nickerson Field. The MLL and US Lacrosse partnered to create the format for this All-Star game, pitting the MLL All-Stars against the United States National Team. The game was a final tune-up for the U.S. Team before they played in the 2006 World Lacrosse Championship.

2007
The 2007 game was played on July 8 in Boston for the second year in row, but this time at Harvard Stadium and was the Western Conference All-Stars against the Eastern Conference All-Stars.

2008
The 2008 game was played in Denver, Colorado, in front of 10,124 people, with the Western Conference defeating the Eastern Conference 31–15, setting a league record for most points scored by an all-star team. Game MVP Ryan Powell scored a record six goals, and also had one assist.

2009
The 2009 game used the "Young Guns vs Old School" format. The "Young Guns" squad was composed of players from the 2007–2009 classes, while the "Old School" squad was made up by those players from the classes prior to and including 2006.

2010s

2010
The 2010 game switched it up from their past years teams by having the national lacrosse team, Team USA vs. MLL All-Stars.

2011
The 2011 game, the teams were selected by a pair of honorary captains, who earned the privilege after winning the "Ultimate MLL Fan Fantasy" Contest. "Team Warrior" by Nathan Solomon, a 14-year-old Chesapeake Bayhawks fan from Alpharetta, Georgia and "Team Authority" by Michael Hatala, a 13-year-old Long Island Lizards fan of Glen Cove, New York, selected the teams on the Friday night before the game.

2012
For the 2012 game, MLL returned to the Young Guns vs. Old School teams as in years past.

2013
The 2013 game featured new team names: Team Supernova vs. Team Eclipse.

2016
The 2016 game featured two new team names: Team Riptide vs. Team Rolling Thunder. With only 4,217 fans attending, it was the lowest attendance for a MLL All-Star Game.

2019
The 2019 All-Star Game, the 19th addition, players were voted into the contest by MLL fans and then drafted into teams called Fire and Ice. Team captains were Rob Pannell with B.J. O'Hara as the coach (Fire) and Lyle Thompson with Bill Warder as the coach (Ice). The game took place on Saturday July 27 at Navy-Marine Corps Memorial Stadium in Annapolis, Maryland. Team Ice won by a sudden victory overtime goal by 21-year-old rookie Brendan Sunday 16–15. Even though Team Fire was defeated, Dylan Molloy of Fire earned the MVP honors with a check for $10,000 from sponsor New Balance. Molloy had 5 goals, 1 assist and 6 points.

Year by year results

References

2016 All-star game media guide

 
Recurring sporting events established in 2001